The Book of Saladin is an historical novel by Pakistani-born British writer Tariq Ali, first published in 1998. The second in Ali’s Islam Quintet, the narrative purports to be the memoir of the 12th-century Muslim leader Saladin, or Salah al-Din, who famously captured Jerusalem from the Crusaders in 1187.

Synopsis
Written as part memoir by Saladin and part biography by Jewish scribe Ibn Yakub, who is given permission to interview the great man’s wife and close associates, the novel tells the story of Salah al-Din, a Kurdish warrior who became a hero of the Muslim world due to his heroics against the Crusaders and was made Sultan of Egypt and Syria as a reward. 
Parallels are drawn between the Egypt and Syria of the Middle Ages and the Middle East of the present day, with all of the disagreements and strife so familiar today.

External links
Tariq Ali discussing the Third Crusade and Saladin; BBC In Our Time Radio 4, with presenter Melvyn Bragg and Jonathan Riley-Smith, Dixie Professor of Ecclesiastical History at Cambridge University and author of many books on the Crusades, Carole Hillenbrand, Professor of Islamic History University of Edinburgh

Reviews
https://www.kirkusreviews.com/book-reviews/tariq-ali/the-book-of-saladin/
https://www.goodreads.com/book/show/184304.The_Book_of_Saladin
http://www.historicalnovels.info/Book-of-Saladin.html

References

1998 British novels
Novels set in the Middle East
British historical novels
Novels by Tariq Ali
Novels set in the 12th century
Novels set during the Crusades
The Book
Verso Books books